Young, Violent, Dangerous, is a 1976 Italian "poliziottesco" film directed by Romolo Guerrieri. It is based on the short stories "Bravi ragazzi bang bang and In pineta si uccide meglio, both included in Giorgio Scerbanenco's short stories collection Milano calibro 9.

Plot
In Italy, three young men go on a violent crime spree and end up being chased by the police across the country.

 Cast 
 Tomas Milian as Commissioner
 Stefano Patrizi as Mario 
 Max Delys as Luis 
 Benjamin Lev as Giò 
 Eleonora Giorgi as Lea 
 Diego Abatantuono as Lucio
 Venantino Venantini 
 Gloria Piedimonte

ProductionYoung, Violent, Dangerous story by Fernando di Leo was based on the short stories of Giorgio Scerbanenco, specifically Bravi ragazzi bang bang and In pineta si uccide meglio, both included in his short stories collection Milano calibro 9.

The film was shot at Elios Film in Milan and on location in Milan and Pavia.

ReleaseYoung, Violent, Dangerous'' was distributed theatrically in Italy by Interfilm on 2 September 1976. The film grossed a total of 856,779,300 Italian lire domestically. The film was released on DVD in Italy by the label Raro and its soundtrack on compact disc by Beat Records.

See also 
 List of Italian films of 1976

Notes

References

External links

1976 films
1970s crime films
Films based on short fiction
Films based on works by Giorgio Scerbanenco
Films directed by Romolo Guerrieri
Poliziotteschi films
Films shot in Milan
1970s Italian films